Raj Kamal (15 January 1928 – 1 September 2005) was a well-known Indian composer. He composed classics such as the unforgettable Chashm-e-Buddoor, kahan se aaye badra, kaali ghodi dwaar khadi, Sawan Ko Aane Do, Chand Jaise Mukhde pe sung by K. J. Yesudas, Taqdeer se koi sung by Anandkumar C, and several other well-known songs. He also composed the music of B.R. Chopra's classic television show Mahabharat.

Personal life
Composer Raj Kamal was born to Tulsidas and his wife in a village called Mathaniya in Rajasthan. He was named Dalpat after birth, a name he would later change to Raj Kamal for Bollywood. He was the eldest of 5 children. Raj Kamal came to Bombay with his whole family; his father having been persuaded by his brother, tabla maestro Pt. Bansilal Bharati. After marriage, Raj Kamal and his wife Sagar had 6 children - Chandra Kamal, Surya Kamal, Vinay Kamal, Hriday Kamal, Shubh Kamal, and a daughter Sunita Kamal. His three elder sons are all composers and musicians in their own right.
Raj Kamal died aged 77 on 1 September 2005 from Alzheimer's disease which had severely affected his memory.

Career

Filmography

As director
Zakhmi Haseena (2001)

Discography

Films

Television

Bhajans

References

External links

http://movies.indiatimes.com/articleshow/1216420.cms
http://www.dishant.com/album/chashme-buddoor-(1981).html

Indian film score composers
1928 births
2005 deaths
20th-century Indian musicians
Neurological disease deaths in India
Deaths from Alzheimer's disease